Mithavirana is a small village located in Vav taluka in Banaskantha district in the Indian state of Gujarat. Mithavirana is old village in Vav. Gadhavi's are Jagirdar of nearby village Mithavi Charan and Mithavi Rana belong to then Princely state of Vav.

References

Villages in Banaskantha district

Charan